Tom Steinberg is a nonprofit leader and author, with a career history mainly in public interest technology, and in the profession of grantmaking. He is the co-author of the book 'Modern Grantmaking: A Guide for Funders Who Believe Better is Possible' and is a co-director and founding editor of Teaching Public Service in the Digital Age, an open access education project.

He is the founder and a former director of mySociety, a British-based international NGO that develops civic tech tools including TheyWorkForYou, Alaveteli and FixMyStreet. Steinberg worked in the Prime Minister's Strategy Unit from 2001 to 2003.

Biography
Steinberg co-authored Open source methods and their future potential which argued that the principles of the open source model could have radical implications for governments, citizens and businesses.

The Power of Information: An Independent Review by Ed Mayo and Tom Steinberg was published in 2007; as was the official government response to it.

In May 2010, it was announced that Steinberg would be part of the UK Government's new Transparency Board, which was to be established to promote "greater transparency across Government". He resigned in the second quarter of 2012.

Steinberg describes himself as 'a left-of-centre moderate'. In November 2012, at the request of Tom Watson MP, he published the policy papers he had written for both Labour and Conservative MPs, Ministers and party staff. In doing so, he wrote:

In March 2015, Steinberg announced his decision to stand down as the head of mySociety while, in his words, "we’ve got a good map, a solid car, and we’ve got enough money for fuel". In 2019, he co-authored with World Bank political scientist Tiago C. Peixoto the report Citizen Engagement : Emerging Digital Technologies Create New Risks and Value. In 2020 Steinberg co-founded Teaching Public Services in the Digital Age, an initiative supported by the Harvard Kennedy School that aims to increase the number of public servants who have the skills needed to succeed in the digital era.

References

External links
 Tom Steinberg, MySociety and the Tories – Tom Watson's blog
 About Tom Steinberg – MySociety

British businesspeople
MySociety
Date of birth missing (living people)
Living people
Open content people
Year of birth missing (living people)